Kibuna is a village in Saue Parish, Harju County in northern Estonia. Prior to the administrative reform of Estonian local governments in 2017, the village belonged to Kernu Parish. It has a station on the Elron western route.

References

Villages in Harju County